On the Water is the third album by synthpop band Future Islands. The album was released on 11 October 2011 on Thrill Jockey records.

The album was recorded in a friend's house in Elizabeth City, North Carolina between March and May 2011.  Wye Oak's Jenn Wasner duets on The Great Fire.

The album peaked at number 12 on the Billboard Heatseekers chart.

Track listing

Reception

The album received generally positive reviews with Pitchfork giving it 7.7/10 and The A.V. Club giving it an A−. The aggregated score from 21 critics on Metacritic is 80/100.

References

External links
Allmusic profile

2011 albums
Future Islands albums